William Stephen "Bill" Tilney (born 1939) served as mayor of El Paso, Texas from 1991–93. He later taught United States history from 2000–03 at Jackie Robinson Academy in Long Beach, California. Prior to assuming his mayoral role, Tilney was the U.S. Consul General in Ciudad Juárez, Mexico.

References

Living people
Mayors of El Paso, Texas
1939 births